Jana Novotná was the defending champion but did not compete that year.

Patty Schnyder won in the final 3–6, 6–4, 6–0 against Dominique Van Roost.

Seeds
A champion seed is indicated in bold text while text in italics indicates the round in which that seed was eliminated. The top two seeds received a bye to the second round.

  Sandrine Testud (semifinals)
  Dominique Van Roost (final)
  Patty Schnyder (champion)
  Barbara Schett (semifinals)
  Virginia Ruano Pascual (first round)
  Florencia Labat (first round)
  Magüi Serna (quarterfinals)
  Kimberly Po (second round)

Draw

Final

Section 1

Section 2

External links
 1998 Páginas Amarillas Open Draw

Singles